Die Healing is the seventh studio album by the American doom metal band Saint Vitus, released in 1995 by Hellhound Records. In addition to being their final album before disbanding in 1996, Die Healing saw the band reunite with the original lineup of vocalist Scott Reagers, guitarist Dave Chandler, bassist Mark Adams and drummer Armando Acosta. It would, however, be the last Saint Vitus album to feature Acosta before his death in 2010, and Reagers for 20 years until his return to the band in 2015.

In 2010, the album was reissued on limited-edition vinyl by Buried By Time And Dust Records.

Track listing
All songs written by Dave Chandler.

 "Dark World" - 4:57
 "One Mind" - 4:34
 "Let the End Begin" - 7:36
 "Trail of Pestilence" - 5:10
 "Sloth" - 8:10
 "Return of the Zombie" - 6:42
 "In the Asylum" - 8:11
 "Just Another Notch" - 4:29

Personnel
Saint Vitus
 Scott Reagers - vocals
 Dave Chandler - guitar, vocals on "Just Another Notch"
 Mark Adams - bass
 Armando Acosta - drums

Production
Harris Johns - producer, engineer

References

Saint Vitus (band) albums
1995 albums
Hellhound Records albums
Albums produced by Harris Johns